Caluma is a location in the Bolívar Province, Ecuador. It is the seat of the Caluma Canton.

References 
 www.inec.gov.ec
 www.ame.gov.ec
 www.caluma.jobs

External links 
 Map of the Bolívar Province

Populated places in Bolívar Province (Ecuador)